Cerdedo-Cotobade is a municipality in the province of Pontevedra in the autonomous community of Galicia, in Spain. It arose from the merger on September 22, 2016 of Cerdedo and Cotobade municipalities.

References

Municipalities in the Province of Pontevedra
States and territories established in 2016